Pervokamensky is a rural locality (a khutor) in Talovskoye Rural Settlement, Yelansky District, Volgograd Oblast, Russia. The population was 148 as of 2010. There are 3 streets.

Geography 
Pervokamensky is located on Khopyorsko-Buzulukskaya Plain, on the bank of the Chyornaya River, 79 km southwest of Yelan (the district's administrative centre) by road. Talovka is the nearest rural locality.

References 

Rural localities in Yelansky District